Dương Đức Thủy (born 14 April 1961) is a Vietnamese athlete. He competed in the men's triple jump at the 1980 Summer Olympics.

References

External links
 

1961 births
Living people
Athletes (track and field) at the 1980 Summer Olympics
Vietnamese male triple jumpers
Olympic athletes of Vietnam
Place of birth missing (living people)